Xinyi Road (also called 2nd Blvd) is an eastbound one-way arterial forming a one-way couplet with the nearby Renai Road (3rd Blvd), connecting the Zhongzheng District with the Xinyi District in Taipei, Taiwan. Its western terminus is at the East Gate of Taipei's former city wall, at the intersection of Zhongshan Road, Ketagalan Boulevard, and Renai Road.  Near the eastern terminus, there is a new interchange with the new Xinyi Expressway, a new highway connecting Xinyi Road in the Xinyi District to National Highway 3 in the Muzha District.

Xinyi Road is known for the location of the original Din Tai Fung restaurant, which is famous for its Taiwanese dumplings, and as well as the location of the Taipei 101 skyscraper. In recent years, landscaped medians separating traffic have been added, along with a contra-flow bus rapid transit lane. The Xinyi Line of Taipei Metro runs underneath Xinyi Road.

See also
 List of roads in Taiwan

References

Streets in Taipei